The 1978 World Sportscar Championship season was the 26th season of FIA World Sportscar Championship motor racing. It featured the 1978 World Championship for Makes, which was contested from 4 February to 3 September 1978 over an eight race series. The 24 Hours of Daytona and the 1000 km Nürburgring were part of the inaugural FIA World Challenge for Endurance Drivers.

The championship was open to cars in Groups 1 to 5, i.e.:
 Group 1 Series Touring Cars
 Group 2 Touring Cars 
 Group 3 Series Grand Touring Cars 
 Group 4 Grand Touring Cars 
 Group 5 Special Production Cars

Porsche was awarded the overall championship  and the Division 2 title for cars with an engine capacity of over 2 litres. BMW was awarded the Division 1 title for cars with an engine capacity of up to 2 litres  and Porsche won the GT Cup.

Schedule

Round results

Points system
Points were awarded to the top 10 finishers in each division on a 20-15-12-10-8-6-4-3-2-1 basis. Manufacturers were only allocated points for their highest finishing car with no points awarded for positions filled by any other car from that manufacturer.

Only the best six points finishes could be retained towards the championship, with any other points earned not included in the total.

Championship results

The overall championship was awarded to the winner of Division 2 (Over 2000cc), Porsche thus scoring their third straight World Championship for Makes victory.

Division 1 (Up to 2000cc)

Division 2 (Over 2000cc)

GT Cup

References

External links
 1978 World Championship for Makes race results at wsrp.ic.cz

World Sportscar Championship seasons
World Sportscar Championship